The Millennium Bible (full title: Pismo Święte: Starego i Nowego Testamentu, Biblia Tysiąclecia, transl.: Holy Scripture: Old and New Testament, Bible of the Millenium) is the main Polish Bible translation used in the liturgy of the Roman Catholic Church in Poland. Its first edition was published in 1965 for the 1000-year anniversary of the baptism of Poland in 966.

References

External links 
 Biblia Tysiąclecia - official website and online text

1965 non-fiction books
Bible translations into Polish
1965 in Christianity